Daniel Son; Necklace Don is the ninth mixtape by American rapper 2 Chainz. It was released on August 5, 2016 independently by 2 Chainz. The project consists of ten tracks, with guest appearances from Drake and YFN Lucci, with production from TM88, C4, Dun Deal, DJ Spinz, Bobby Kritical, K Swisha, Mr. 2-17, Southside, and Buddah Bless. Artwork was illustrated by Kid Graphic. Originally the seventh track on the tape, "Big Amount" was removed from the tracklist and included as a digital bonus track on his fourth studio album "Pretty Girls Like Trap Music".

Critical reception

Daniel Son; Necklace Don received generally favorable reviews, with XXL Magazine giving the mixtape a 3 out of 5 stars.

Track listing

References

External links
Official download on DatPiff

2 Chainz albums
2016 mixtape albums
Albums produced by Southside (record producer)
Albums produced by TM88